Heart of the Decision Bloc is a parliamentary bloc in the Lebanese National Assembly, formed on May 11, 2018 by Farid Haykal Khazen and Moustapha Husseini, two newly elected parliamentarians from the Byblos-Kesrwan electoral district.

References

Political parties in Lebanon

Parliamentary blocs of Lebanon